CGGS can refer to:
Calday Grange Grammar School
Canberra Girls' Grammar School
Camberwell Girls Grammar School